January is the first month of the year.

January may also refer to:

Literature
January (novel), the first book in the Countdown series by Daniel Parker
January (play), a 1974 play by Yordan Radichkov
January Magazine, a book-review website

Music
January (Marcin Wasilewski album) or the title composition, 2007
January (Page McConnell and Trey Anastasio album), 2023
"January" (song), a song by Pilot, 1975 
"January", a song by Elton John from The Big Picture, 1997

People
January (surname), the surname of several people
January (given name), the given name of several people

See also
Captain January (disambiguation), the name of a book and two films
January Club, a discussion group founded in 1934 by Oswald Mosley
Janvier, French for January